Patrick Houston (September 30, 1837 – 1901) was a state senator and military man from Leon County, Florida, United States.

Houston was born in Savannah, Georgia to Edward Houston (Houstoun) and came to Tallahassee, Florida in 1838 or 1839.

Civil War
He served as a lieutenant in Gamble's Florida Light Artillery and in the Kilcrease Light Artillery. He was in command of the artillery battery at the Battle of Natural Bridge when Union Army forces under General John Newton came ashore near St. Marks, Florida.

Post Civil War
Houston served on the Leon County Commission and served in Florida State Senate, presiding over the senate in 1887. He was appointed Adjutant General of the State of Florida by Governor Henry Laurens Mitchell serving from 1893 to 1897.

Houston and farming
Houston's farm was known as Lakeland Stock Farm. There he bred 250 head of Durham, Jersey and Guernsey cattle. Houston also is reported to have had 20 horses, 10 mules, and 500 head of sheep.

References

External links
Florida Department of State database

1837 births
1910 deaths
History of Leon County, Florida
People of Florida in the American Civil War
People from Leon County, Florida